2,2′-Dipyridylamine is an organic compound with the formula (C5H4N)2NH.  It consists of a pair of 2-pyridyl groups (C5H4N) linked to a secondary amine.  The compound forms a range of coordination complexes.  Its conjugate base, 2,2′-dipyridylamide, forms extended metal atom chains.

Formation
2,2′-Dipyridylamine can be formed by heating pyridine with sodium amide. Alternatively, 2-aminopyridine can be heated with 2-chloropyridine over barium oxide.

References

Aminopyridines
Chelating agents